Sun Tiantian and Nenad Zimonjić won the mixed doubles title at the 2008 Australian Open, defeating Sania Mirza and Mahesh Bhupathi in the final 7–6(7–4), 6–4.

Elena Likhovtseva and Daniel Nestor were the defending champions, but Likhovtseva did not participate in this Australian Open. Nestor partnered with Zheng Jie, but lost in the first round to Chan Yung-jan and Eric Butorac.

Seeds

Draw

Finals

Top half

Bottom half

External links
Draw
 2008 Australian Open – Doubles draws and results at the International Tennis Federation

Mixed Doubles
Australian Open (tennis) by year – Mixed doubles